Zygopetalum crinitum is a species of orchid.

It is endemic to the Atlantic Forest ecoregion in southern and southeastern Brazil.

It grows at elevations of 600 to 1200 meters.

References

External links 
 
 

crinitum
Endemic orchids of Brazil
Flora of the Atlantic Forest